Radziszewo  (German: Schneidersfelde) is a village in the administrative district of Gmina Stargard, within Stargard County, West Pomeranian Voivodeship, in north-western Poland.

The village has a population of 15.

References

Radziszewo